Rodney Butcher (born February 4, 1970) is an American professional golfer.

Butcher was born in Weymouth, Massachusetts. He went to Florida Southern College (where he was a three-time NCAA Division II All-American) and graduated in 1992 with a degree in finance. He turned pro that same year.

Butcher played on the Nike Tour (now Nationwide Tour) full-time in 1998. He does not currently play on a specific tour, and over the years has not amassed much success on either the PGA Tour or the Nationwide Tour. He has, however, won many state opens along with the 2003 Bay Mills Open Players Championship on the Canadian Tour.

In 2009, Butcher played in three Nationwide Tour events, and three PGA Tour events, after a 5-year absence from either Tour.

Professional wins (9)

Canadian Tour wins (1)
2003 Bay Mills Open Players Championship

Other wins (8)
1995 Florida Open, Vermont Open
1997 Maine Open
1998 Massachusetts Open
2000 Rhode Island Open
2001 Vermont Open
2003 Vermont Open
2009 MS Coast Open

Results in major championships

DNP = did not play
CUT = missed the half-way cut
"T" = tie
Yellow background for top-10.

External links

American male golfers
Florida Southern Moccasins men's golfers
PGA Tour golfers
Golfers from Massachusetts
Sportspeople from Weymouth, Massachusetts
1970 births
Living people